The Jain Temple, Dubai (referred to locally as Derasar) is a house temple (ghar derasar) in Dubai, United Arab Emirates (UAE).

About temple 
The temple caters for the large Jain community in the United Arab Emirates and is the only Shewtambar Jain temple in Bur Dubai, where most of the Jains reside. The temple complex has Lord Vimalanatha, the  thirteenth Jain Tirthankar as Moolnayak, Lord Parshwanath, the  twenty third Tirthankar and Lord Sumatinath, the  Fifth Tirthankar. Padmavati mata moorti is also there in this temple. There are more than 10,000 Jains in Dubai as of 2012.

See also
 List of Jain temples

References

Citations

Sources 
  

Jain temples in the United Arab Emirates
Religious buildings and structures in Dubai